Abū ‘Abd Allāh Nu‘aym bin Ḥammād al-Khuzā‘ī al-Marwazī (13 Jumada al-Awwal 228 AH / 18 February 843 CE in Samarra) was a traditionist from Marw al-Rudh and was later based in Egypt and Baghdad. He was nicknamed Farid or Faradi due to his reputation in the field of succession law (farā’iḍ).

Life 

His scientific work as a collector of hadith falls within the period before the drafting of the first major canonical tradition collections . He was followed by, among others, al-Bukhari Hadith and processed them in his "Sahih". Nu'aim ibn Hammaad studied and taught first in Basra, then moved to Egypt, where he lived for forty years. In theological questions he followed the Islamic doctrine.

Consequently, he refused during the Mihna that createdness the Qur'an al-Khalq Quran / خلق القرآن / Halq al-Qur'ān and other teachings of the Mu'tazilah recognized and has therefore been deported with other magicians of Egypt to Baghdad. He died in prison in Samarra in Baghdad

Works 

His scientific work as a collector of Ḥadīth falls in the period prior to the drafting of the first large collections of canonical tradition.  He took the ʾaḥādīth found in al-Bukhārī and collated them in his own collection of Ṣaḥīḥ. Naʿīm/Nuʿaym bin Ḥammād studied and taught first in Baṣrah, then moved to Egypt where he lived for forty years.  In theological questions, he followed Sunni dogma.

References

863 deaths
9th-century Arabs
Hadith compilers
Mahdism